Sweden competed at the 1906 Intercalated Games in Athens, Greece. 39 athletes, all men, competed in 37 events in 8 sports.

Athletics

Track

Field

Cycling

Diving

Fencing

Shooting

Swimming

Tug of war

All matches were best-of-three pulls.

 Round 1

 Bronze Medal Match

Weightlifting

References

Nations at the 1906 Intercalated Games
1906
Intercalated Games